Christian Erich Elger  (born on October 21, 1949 in Augsburg) is a German neurologist at the Center for Economics and Neuroscience CENs in Bonn.

Early life and education 
After graduating from high school in Stuttgart in 1968, Elger studied mathematics and chemistry in Tübingen. He moved to Münster and He graduated M.D. (Doctor of Medicine) in 1976 at University of Münster and Ph.D. in Physiology in 1982.

Academic career

From 1976 to 1982 he was an assistant at the Institute of Physiology at the University of Münster (with the neurophysiologist Erwin-Josef Speckmann) with a qualification in physiology in 1982. He then completed his Medical Recognition training in neurology in Münster, Memphis (USA) and Zurich until 1985 (Switzerland). He has been Professor of Epileptology at the University of Bonn since 1987, and from 1990 to 2018 (retirement) as Full Professor and Director of the Epileptology Clinic at Bonn University Hospital, Was Co-Founder and Director  Center for Economics and Neuroscience CENs in Bonn.

References

1949 births
Living people
German neurologists
University of Münster alumni